Frank Korpershoek (born 29 October 1984) is a Dutch former professional footballer who played his entire career as a midfielder for Telstar in the Eerste Divisie.

He announced his retirement from professional football on 15 February 2021 after having played 15 years for Telstar. He would instead pursue a career in coaching, and was appointed assistant coach of Koninklijke HFC in June 2021.

References

External links
 Voetbal International profile 

1984 births
Living people
Dutch footballers
SC Telstar players
Eerste Divisie players
AFC Ajax non-playing staff
People from Heemstede
Association football midfielders
Footballers from North Holland